is a Japanese manga series written and illustrated by Akihito Tsukushi. It has been serialized online in Takeshobo's digital publication Web Comic Gamma since October 2012, and has been collected into eleven tankōbon volumes. The story follows an orphaned girl named Riko, who finds and befriends a part-robot boy named Reg, and descends with him into the titular "Abyss" that leads deep into the Earth, in hopes of exploring it and finding her mother.

An anime television series adaptation produced by Kinema Citrus, aired from July to September 2017. A sequel film, subtitled Dawn of the Deep Soul, premiered in Japan in January 2020. A second season, titled Made in Abyss: The Golden City of the Scorching Sun, aired from July to September 2022. A sequel to the second season has been announced.

A live-action film adaptation began development in 2021, with Kevin McMullin hired to write and direct. An action role-playing game developed by Chime Corporation and published by Spike Chunsoft was released in September 2022.

Plot

An orphaned girl named Riko lives in the Belchero Orphanage in the town of Orth. The town surrounds a strange, giant hole descending deep into the earth, which is known as the Abyss. The Abyss harbors artifacts and remnants of civilizations long gone, and is, therefore, a popular hunting spot for so-called Cave Raiders, who undertake arduous and dangerous descents into the mist-filled pit to recover whatever relics they can find. Returning from the Abyss can be dangerous as "the Curse of the Abyss," a mysterious and potentially fatal malady, manifests upon ascension. The deeper one goes, the more acute the effects of the curse; few who have descended into the lower regions have returned to tell of their experiences. Some legendary Cave Raiders earn the title of White Whistles, one of them being Riko's mother, Lyza, who is presumed dead after taking a "last descent" into the Abyss.

Riko's longing in life is to follow in her mother's footsteps and become a White Whistle. One day, she discovers a half-human/half-robot boy in the first layer of the Abyss and names him Reg (after a dog that Riko owned). Riko and her friends sneak Reg into Belchero and quickly welcome him into their close-knit group. Sometime later, a number of findings are made from the depths of the Abyss, including Lyza’s White Whistle and pages of discoveries and observations she had made, as well as a message presumably for Riko, stating she is waiting at the bottom of the Abyss. Riko, determined to find her mother, bids farewell to her friends and secretly departs into the Abyss with Reg as her companion.

Media

Manga

Written and illustrated by Akihito Tsukushi, Made in Abyss started on Takeshobo's Manga Life Win+ (later Web Comic Gamma) website on October 20, 2012. Takeshobo has collected its chapters into individual tankōbon volumes. The first volume was released on July 31, 2013. As of July 29, 2022, eleven volumes have been released.

In North America, Seven Seas Entertainment announced during their panel at Anime Expo 2017 that they had licensed the manga. 
The translator of the anime for Sentai Filmworks, Jake Jung, also adapted the manga for Seven Seas Entertainment. Regarding his involvement in the English version of both media, he stated, "Made in Abyss is chock-full of terminology, so I hope fans of both media are able to enjoy a seamless experience." In addition, he has confirmed his intention to avoid gendered pronouns for both Nanachi and Marulk.

A manga anthology, titled , was released on July 29, 2017. On December 13, 2019, Seven Seas announced they had licensed the book, and they released it on October 6, 2020. As of July 2021, a total of four anthologies have been published.

Anime

An anime television series adaptation was announced in December 2016. The 13-episode series aired from July 7 to September 29, 2017 on AT-X, Tokyo MX, TV Aichi, Sun TV, KBS Kyoto, TVQ, Saga TV, and BS11, and covers content from volumes 1 through 3. The final episode was a 1-hour long special. The series was directed by Masayuki Kojima and written by Hideyuki Kurata, with animation by Kinema Citrus and character designs by Kazuchika Kise. Australian artist Kevin Penkin composed the soundtrack for the anime. Miyu Tomita and Mariya Ise, the voice actresses for Riko and Reg, respectively, performed both the opening theme "Deep in Abyss" and the ending theme "Tabi no Hidarite, Saihate no Migite", the latter in collaboration with Shiori Izawa (Nanachi). The first season premiered on Adult Swim's Toonami programming block on January 16, 2022.

A sequel was announced at an event in November 2017.

Following the release of the first compilation film, the sequel was revealed to be a film titled . The film premiered in Japan on January 17, 2020. The film had been set to premiere in the United States at Anime Boston on April 11, 2020 before that convention's cancellation due to the COVID-19 pandemic. Regular theater showings in the U.S. had been planned for April 13 (English dub) and 15 (English subtitles).

Following the release of Dawn of the Deep Soul, a new sequel was announced. On May 5, 2021, it was announced that the sequel was a second season, officially titled , which aired from July 6 to September 28, 2022. The main cast and staff reprised their roles. Riko Azuna performed the opening theme "Katachi", while Myth & Roid performed the ending theme "Endless Embrace".

A sequel to The Golden City of the Scorching Sun was announced on January 15, 2023.

Sentai Filmworks has licensed the series, and streamed it on Amazon's Anime Strike service in the U.S. and on HIDIVE outside of the U.S. Sentai has since released it on home video with an English dub. MVM Films has acquired the series for distribution in the UK and Ireland, and Madman Entertainment has acquired the series for distribution in Australia and New Zealand. Sentai Filmworks has licensed the two compilation films, and screened the first film at Regal Cinemas in Los Angeles on March 15, 2019, with a subtitled theatrical release on March 20, 2019, and an English dubbed theatrical release on March 25, 2019, in collaboration with Fathom Events. During its panel at Anime Expo on July 5, 2019, Sentai Filmworks announced that they had acquired the license for Dawn of the Deep Soul. Sentai Filmworks planned to screen the film in North America, the United Kingdom, and Ireland with English subtitles on April 13, 2020 subtitled, and with the English dub on April 15, 2020. However, the screenings were postponed due to the COVID-19 pandemic. Sentai Filmworks also acquired the second season for distribution worldwide except Asia, France, Germany, Italy and Middle East and North Africa, and streamed it on select digital outlets.

Video game
An action role-playing game, titled , was developed by Chime Corporation and published by Spike Chunsoft, with Numskull Games publishing the physical versions in Europe. It is fully voiced in English and Japanese and features an original story supervised by Tsukushi. The game was released on Nintendo Switch, PlayStation 4, and Windows on September 1, 2022 in Japan, and the following day in North America and Europe.

Live-action film
In June 2021, Sony's Columbia Pictures announced that a live-action film adaptation was in development. The film will be produced by Roy Lee and Masi Oka and adapted by Kevin McMullin.

Reception

Manga
Made in Abyss was nominated for the 11th Manga Taishō awards and received a total of 40 points, coming in at eighth place. The series ranked 13th on Kono Manga ga Sugoi!'''s top 20 manga for male readers 2018. It was nominated for the French 12th ACBD's Prix Asie de la Critique 2018. As of February 2020, the manga had over 3 million copies in circulation.

AnimeMade in Abyss has been met with positive reviews and is widely considered to be one of the best anime series of the 2010s. Crunchyroll listed the series in their "Top 100 best anime of the 2010s". IGN also listed it among the best anime series of the 2010s. Lauren Orsini of Forbes included Made in Abyss on her list of the best anime of the decade. It was one of the Jury Recommended Works in the Animation Division at the 21st Japan Media Arts Festival in 2018.

Nick Creamer of Anime News Network praised the anime for being adventure-focused, as well as its efficiency in establishing its premise. Creamer also praises it for its artwork and music that highlights the beauty and terror of the Abyss. Julian Malerman of THEM Anime Reviews praises the show for being a well-executed emotional drama saying "The manner in which the show approaches this conclusion is often brutal and alienating, but the final answer is simple and pure. It sings."Made in Abyss was awarded Anime of the Year and Best Score at the 2nd Crunchyroll Anime Awards in 2018. The series won the 2018 Anime Trending Awards'' in the Best in Adaptation, Best in Soundtrack and Action or Adventure Anime of the Year, and was nominated for several other categories. It also won the 25th Spanish Manga Barcelona award for the Best Anime category in 2019.

Notes

References

External links
 
 

2017 anime television series debuts
2022 anime television series debuts
2022 video games
Adventure anime and manga
Anime films based on manga
Anime series based on manga
Anime Strike
Cannibalism in fiction
Crunchyroll Anime Awards winners
Dark fantasy anime and manga
Hideyuki Kurata
Infanticide
Japanese webcomics
Kinema Citrus
Muse Communication
Nintendo Switch games
PlayStation 4 games
Science fiction anime and manga
Seinen manga
Sentai Filmworks
Seven Seas Entertainment titles
Spike Chunsoft video games
Takeshobo manga
Toonami
Webcomics in print
Windows games